Team Fortress 2 is a 2007 multiplayer first-person shooter game developed and published by Valve Corporation. It is the sequel to the 1996 Team Fortress mod for Quake and its 1999 remake, Team Fortress Classic. The game was released in October 2007 as part of The Orange Box for Windows and the Xbox 360, and ported to the PlayStation 3 in December 2007. It was released as a standalone game for Windows in April 2008, and updated to support Mac OS X in June 2010 and Linux in February 2013. It is distributed online through Valve's digital retailer Steam, with Electronic Arts managing retail and console editions.

Players join one of two teams—RED and BLU—and choose one of nine character classes to play as in game modes such as capture the flag and king of the hill. Development was led by John Cook and Robin Walker, the developers of the original Team Fortress mod. Team Fortress 2 was announced in 1998 under the name Team Fortress 2: Brotherhood of Arms. Initially, the game had more realistic, militaristic visuals and gameplay, but this changed over the protracted nine years of development. After Valve released no information for six years, Team Fortress 2 regularly featured in Wired News annual vaporware list among other entries. Finally released on the Source game engine in 2007, Team Fortress 2 would preserve much of the core class-based gameplay of its predecessors while featuring an overhauled, cartoon-like visual style influenced by the works of J. C. Leyendecker, Dean Cornwell, and Norman Rockwell, alongside an increased focus on the visual and verbal characterization of its playable classes and what the developers have described as a 1960s spy movie aesthetic.

Team Fortress 2 has received critical acclaim for its art direction, gameplay, humor, and use of character in a wholly multiplayer game and since its release has been referred to as one of the greatest video games ever created. The game continues to receive official Valve server support as of January 2023, in addition to new content being released on a seasonal basis in the form of submissions made through the Steam Workshop. In June 2011, the game became free-to-play, supported by microtransactions for in-game cosmetics. A 'drop system' was also added and refined, allowing free-to-play users to periodically receive in-game equipment and items. Though the game has had an unofficial competitive scene since its release, both support for official competitive play through ranked matchmaking and an overhauled casual experience were added in July 2016. Since early 2020, official Valve servers for the game have seen an influx of bot accounts using cheat software, often inhibiting normal gameplay.

Gameplay 

In most game modes, BLU and RED compete for a combat-based objective. Players can choose to play as one of nine character classes in these teams, each with their own unique strengths, weaknesses, and weapon sets. In order to accomplish objectives efficiently, a balance of these classes is required due to how these strengths and weaknesses interact with each other in a team-based environment. Although the abilities of a number of classes have changed from earlier Team Fortress incarnations, the basic elements of each class have remained, that being one primary weapon, one secondary weapon, and one melee weapon. The game was released with six official maps, although over one hundred maps have since been included in subsequent updates, including community-created maps. When players choose a gamemode for the first time, an introductory video is played, showing how to complete its objectives. During matches, the Administrator, voiced by Ellen McLain, announces events over loudspeakers. The player limit for one match is 16 on the Xbox 360 and PlayStation 3, and 24 on the Windows edition. However, in 2008, the Windows edition was updated to include a server variable that allows for up to 32 players.

Team Fortress 2 is the first of Valve's multiplayer games to provide detailed statistics for individual players, such as the total amount of time spent playing as each class, most points obtained, and most objectives completed in a single life. Persistent statistics tell the player how they are performing in relation to these statistics, such as if a player comes close to their record for the damage inflicted in a round. Team Fortress 2 also features numerous achievements for carrying out certain tasks, such as achieving a certain number of kills or completing a round within a certain time. Sets of class-specific achievements have been added in updates, which can award weapons to the player upon completion. This unlockable system has since been expanded into a random drop system, whereby players can also obtain items simply by playing the game.

Game modes

Core game modes 
Team Fortress 2 contains five core game modes.

 Attack/Defend (A/D) is a timed game mode in which the BLU team's goal is to capture RED control points. The number of control points varies between maps, and the points must be captured by the BLU team in respective order. To capture a control point, a player must stand on it for a certain amount of time. This process can be sped up by more players on one team capturing a single point. Once a control point is captured by the BLU team, it cannot be re-captured by the RED team. The RED team's job is to prevent the BLU team from capturing all the control points before the time limit ends. Once a point is captured, the time limit will extend.
 Capture the Flag (CtF) is a mode which revolves around the BLU and RED teams attempting to steal and capture the opposing team's flag, represented in-game as an intelligence briefcase. At the same time, both teams must defend their own intelligence. When the intelligence is dropped by the carrier – either by dying or dropping it manually, it will stay on the ground for 1 minute before returning to its original location if it is not picked up again. A team's intelligence can only be carried by the opposing team. The first team to capture the enemy's intelligence three times wins.
 Control Points (CP) is a timed game mode where there are several control points placed around the map, with 3 or 5 control points in total depending on the map. These are referred to as "3CP" and "5CP," respectively. The game will start off with only the middle control point being available for capture, with the other control points split equally among both teams. Once this middle control point is captured, a team can begin capturing the enemy team's points in respective order. The time limit is extended on the capture of a control point by either team. For a team to win, they must capture all the control points within the time limit.
 King of the Hill (KOTH) is a timed game mode that contains a single control point at the middle of the map that can be captured by both the RED and BLU teams. Upon capturing the control point, a team-specific timer starts counting down but stops upon the point being captured by the opposing team. The first team to have their timer count down to 0 wins.
 Payload (PL) is a timed game mode where the BLU team must push an explosive cart along a track, while the RED team must prevent the cart from reaching their base. To push the cart, at least one BLU player must stay within the range of the cart, which will dispense health and ammo every few seconds. The cart's speed will increase as more BLU players attempt to push it. Payload maps have multiple "checkpoints" along the track. Once these checkpoints are captured, they may adjust the spawn locations of both teams. Capturing a checkpoint will also increase the time limit. If the cart is not pushed by the BLU team for 20 seconds, it will begin to move back to the last captured checkpoint, where it will stop. The RED team can stop the cart from being pushed by being within range of it. The RED team wins by preventing the cart from reaching the final checkpoint before time runs out.

Alternative game modes 
There are several alternative game modes in Team Fortress 2. These modes consist of a small number of maps and detach from the core game modes in some way.

 Arena is a special game mode in which players do not respawn upon death. A team can win either by eliminating all opposing players, or by claiming a single capture point that opens after a certain time has elapsed. This mode is currently unavailable through matchmaking, but is still accessible through community servers.
 Mannpower is a mode in which players have access to a grappling hook and assorted power-ups laid around the map that grant unique abilities. While not bound to any specific mode, all current official Mannpower maps use a variation of Capture the Flag. In Mannpower's variation of Capture the Flag, both teams have an intelligence flag, and the first team to capture the enemy's intelligence ten times wins. The mode is heavily inspired by the Quake mod, Threewave CTF, a mod created by former Valve employee David Kirsch.
 Medieval Mode is a mode in which players are restricted to using melee and support weapons, with certain exceptions for medieval-themed projectile weapons. While not bound to any specific mode, the only official Medieval Mode map uses a 3CP variation of Attack/Defend. If Medieval Mode is enabled on a map, select phrases spoken by players in the in-game text chat will be replaced with more thematic variants, such as "hello" being replaced with "well meteth".
 PASS Time is a unique timed game mode inspired by rugby, developed by Valve, Bad Robot Interactive, and Escalation Studios. Three unique goals (the Run-In, Throw-In, and Bonus Goals) are placed on each team's side of the map. A single ball called the JACK will spawn at the center of the map, and players must pick it up and carry it to the opposing team's side. Players can score a goal by either carrying the JACK to a Run-In Goal or by throwing the JACK through the Throw-In Goal. Three goals can be scored by throwing the JACK through the Bonus Goal, which is much more difficult to score. To win, a team must either score five goals, or have the most goals when the timer runs out.
 Payload Race, like Payload, has the main objective being to push a cart to a final checkpoint. Unlike Payload, both the RED and BLU teams are fighting to push their cart to the final checkpoint. There is only one checkpoint for each track, and there is no time limit. The team to reach their checkpoint first wins.
 Player Destruction is a community-made game mode in which a player's death causes a pickup to appear. The first team to collect a set number of pickups and deliver them to a drop-off point wins the game. The players on each team with the most pickups are highlighted for everyone to see, and gain a passive healing effect for themselves and any nearby teammates.
 Special Delivery is a mode similar to Capture the Flag, but there is only one neutral briefcase that can be picked up both the RED and BLU teams. Upon a team picking up the briefcase, the opposing team will be unable to pick up the briefcase until it has been dropped for 45 seconds and respawns as a neutral briefcase. A team wins by carrying the briefcase onto a loading platform, which will gradually rise until the platform reaches its peak.
 Territorial Control consists of several control points spread out across a single map. Like Control Points, each point can be captured by either the RED or BLU teams. Unlike Control Points, only two points are accessible at a single time. Upon a team's successful capture of a point, the "stage" ends and the accessible capture points change. When a team only has control of a single control point, they are blocked from capturing the opposing team's control point and the team must wait until the time limit is up and the accessible capture points change. A team wins by capturing all the control points.

Other game modes 
These modes are not categorized with the other modes, and instead have their own separate sections in the game.

Halloween Mode is a special mode that is enabled during the Halloween season, and allows the players access to more than 20 maps, Halloween-exclusive cosmetics, and challenges. For example, Halloween 2012 included a difficult Mann vs. Machine mission involving destroying more than 800 enemy forces. Owing to popular demand of the Halloween events, Valve later added the Full Moon event, an event that triggers around every full moon phase throughout the year, which allows players to equip Halloween-exclusive cosmetics. In 2013, Valve introduced an item called Eternaween, and upon use, allows players of a specific server to use Halloween-exclusive cosmetics for 2 hours.
Mann vs Machine, also known as MvM, is a cooperative game mode where players must defend their base from waves of robots modeled after all nine playable classes, and slow-moving tanks carrying bombs. Robots and tanks drop a currency referred to as Credits upon their death, which players can use to buy upgrades for themselves or their weapons. The players win upon successfully defending their base from the bomb until the last wave. A paid version of this game mode called "Mann Up" is also available, where players buy tickets to play "Tours of Duty", a collection of missions with the chance to win unique cosmetics and weapon skins upon completion.
Offline Practice Mode is just like any other multiplayer match, but it only consists of the player and bots. The number of bots, their difficulty, and the map can all be adjusted to a player's preference, though only a select amount of maps are available to play.
Training Mode exists to help new players get acquainted with basic controls, and teaches them the basics of four of the nine classes. It uses wooden dummies and bots to teach players the basic mechanics of classes and the game.

Competitive play 
Team Fortress 2 is played competitively, through multiple leagues. The North American league, ESEA, supports a paid Team Fortress 2 league, with $42,000 in prizes for the top teams in 2017. While formalized competitive gameplay is very different from normal Team Fortress 2, it offers an environment with a much higher level of teamwork than in public servers. Most teams use voice chat to communicate, and use a combination of strategy, communication, and mechanical skill to win against other teams. Community-run competitive leagues also tend to feature restrictions such as item bans and class limits. These leagues are often supported by Valve via in-game medals (which are submitted via the Steam Workshop) and announcements on the official blog.

In April 2015, Valve announced that a dedicated competitive mode would be added to Team Fortress 2, utilizing skill-based matchmaking; closed beta testing began in the following year. The competitive mode was added in the "Meet Your Match" update, released on July 7, 2016. Ranked matches are played six-vs-six, with players ranked in thirteen tiers based on win/losses and an assessment of their skills. Ranked matchmaking will balance players based on their tiers and rating. A similar matchmaking approach has been added for casual games for matches of 12-vs-12 players. In order to join competitive matchmaking, players must have associated their Steam account with the Steam Guard Mobile Authenticator, as well as having a Team Fortress 2 "premium account", which is unlocked by either having bought the game before it went free-to-play or by having made an in-game item purchase since.

Formats
Team Fortress 2 is played in a variety of different formats, which dictate the maximum size and composition of a team and can drastically change the impact of a single player's gameplay or choice of class. The two most basic formats consist of 12v12 and 6v6 ("Sixes"), the two being used on official Valve servers for casual and competitive modes respectively with no additional limitations. Most competitive leagues host Sixes but include limits on certain classes and weapons to preserve traditional, skill-based playstyles, for example limiting the allowed amount of medics or demomen to one on either team or banning certain movement-enhancing weapons from use. Other popular formats include "Highlander", a 9v9 format with a limit of one player per each of the nine classes, as well as a Sixes-inspired 7v7 variant thereof known as "Prolander" to allow for strategically switching classes during a competitive game.

Characters and setting 

Team Fortress 2 features nine playable classes, evenly split and categorized into "Offense", "Defense", and "Support". Each class has strengths and weaknesses and must work with other classes to be efficient, encouraging strategy and teamwork. Each class has at least three default weapons: a primary weapon, secondary weapon, and melee weapon. Some classes have additional slots for PDAs.

Offense 

 The Scout (Nathan Vetterlein) is an American baseball fan and street runner from Boston, Massachusetts who practiced running to "beat his mad dog siblings to the fray." He is a fast, agile character, who is armed by default with a scattergun, a pistol, and an aluminum baseball bat. The Scout can double jump, and counts as two people when capturing control points, thus doubling the capture speed, and when pushing the Payload cart.

 The Soldier (Rick May) is an American jingoistic patriot from the Midwest who stylizes himself as a military man despite having never served in any branch of the Armed Forces. The Soldier is armed by default with a rocket launcher, a shotgun, and a folding shovel. He is both the second-slowest class in the game and the class with the second-highest health, after the Heavy Weapons Guy. The Soldier can use his rocket launcher to rocket jump to other locations at the cost of some health.

 The Pyro (Dennis Bateman) is a pyromaniac of unknown gender and origin who wears a fire-retardant suit and a voice-muffling gas mask. By default, the Pyro is armed with a flamethrower, a shotgun, and a fire axe. In addition to simply flames, the Pyro's flamethrower can also produce a blast of compressed air that repels any nearby enemies and projectiles, and extinguishes burning teammates. The Pyro is deluded and believes they are living in a utopian fantasy world referred to as "Pyroland".

Defense 

 The Demoman (Gary Schwartz) is a black Scottish, one-eyed, alcoholic demolitions expert from Ullapool, Scotland. Armed by default with a timed-fuse grenade launcher, a remotely-detonated "stickybomb" launcher, and a glass bottle of scrumpy, the Demoman can use his explosives to provide indirect fire and set traps. The Demoman can use his sticky bomb launcher to "sticky jump" at the cost of some health.

 The Heavy Weapons Guy, or simply the Heavy (Gary Schwartz), is a large Russian man from the Dzhugdzhur Mountains of the USSR. He is heavy in stature and accent, and is obsessed with firepower. He is the slowest class, and can both sustain and deal substantial amounts of damage. His default weapons consist of a minigun that he affectionately refers to as "Sasha", a shotgun, and his fists.

 The Engineer (Grant Goodeve) is an American inventor, engineer, intellectual, and "good ol' boy" from Bee Cave, Texas. The Engineer can build structures to support his team: a sentry gun for defending key points, a health and ammunition dispenser, and a pair of teleporter modules (one entrance and one exit). The Engineer is armed by default with a shotgun, a pistol, a wrench that functions as both a melee weapon and to repair and upgrade his buildings, and two separate PDAs; one to erect his buildings and one to remotely destroy them.

Support 

 The Medic (Robin Atkin Downes) is a German doctor from Stuttgart with little regard for the Hippocratic Oath. He is equipped with a "Medi Gun" that can restore health to injured teammates. When healing teammates, the Medi Gun progressively builds an "ÜberCharge" meter, which, when fully charged, can be activated to provide the Medic and his patient with temporary invulnerability. The Medic is also equipped with a syringe gun and a bonesaw for situations in which he must fight without his teammates' protection. He keeps doves as pets, one of which is named Archimedes.

 The Sniper (John Patrick Lowrie) is a New Zealand ocker raised in the Australian outback, equipped by default with a laser-sighted sniper rifle to shoot enemies from afar. Depending on how the player aims and fires, he can cause severe damage or an instant kill with a headshot. By default, he also carries a submachine gun and a kukri for close combat.

 The Spy (Dennis Bateman) is a French covert operative whose equipment is designed for stealth and infiltration, including a cloaking device disguised as a wristwatch, an electronic sapper used to disable and destroy enemy Engineers' buildings, and a device hidden in his cigarette case that enables him to disguise himself as any player on either team. He is armed with a revolver and a butterfly knife, able to use the latter to instantly kill enemies by stabbing them in the back. He is the only character who does not wear any clothing in his team's bright color or a patch denoting his specialty, instead preferring a balaclava, business suit, necktie, and gloves in muted team-color hues.

Non-playable characters 
Other characters include the Administrator (voiced by Ellen McLain), an unseen announcer who provides information about time limits and objectives to players, and her assistant Miss Pauling (Ashly Burch). The cast has expanded with Halloween updates, including the characters of the "Horseless Headless Horsemann" and Monoculus (Gary Schwartz). 2012 and 2013 saw the addition of Merasmus, the Bombinomicon, and Redmond, Blutarch, Zepheniah, and Gray Mann (the first three all played by Nolan North). Previous unused voicelines recorded by North were later used for Horseless Headless Horsemann seen in the 2019 map "Laughter" and a jack-o'-lantern resting atop the Payload cart in the 2020 map "Bloodwater". The character Davy Jones (voiced by Calvin Kipperman) made an appearance in the 2018 map "Cursed Cove".

In the video announcement for the "Jungle Inferno" update, Mann Co. CEO Saxton Hale, a hypermasculine Australian adventurer, is voiced by JB Blanc.

Setting 

Although Team Fortress 2 is designed as an open-ended multiplayer experience without an active storyline, the game and additional material nonetheless feature a wider narrative centered around the fictional Mann Co., a large shipping and manufacturing company led by CEO Saxton Hale. The main PvP gamemodes are set during the "Gravel Wars", a conflict between the rival heirs Redmond "Red" and Blutarch "Blu" Mann for which the nine playable characters were hired out as mercenaries. Gray Mann later emerges as the third competitor, killing the other two brothers and forcing Hale to rehire the mercenaries to protect Mann Co. from Gray's robot army in the Mann vs Machine cooperative horde shooter mode.

Development

Origins 
The original Team Fortress was developed by the Australian team TF Software, comprising Robin Walker and John Cook, as a free mod for the 1996 PC game Quake. In 1998, Walker and Cook were employed by Valve, which had just released its first game, Half-Life. Valve began developing Team Fortress 2 as an expansion pack for Half-Life using Valve's GoldSrc engine, and gave a release date for the end of the year. In 1999, Valve released Team Fortress Classic, a port of the original Team Fortress, as a free Half-Life mod. Team Fortress Classic was developed using the publicly available Half-Life software development kit as an example to the community and industry of its flexibility.

Unlike Team Fortress, Valve originally planned Team Fortress 2 to have a modern war aesthetic. It would feature innovations including a command hierarchy with a Commander class, parachute drops over enemy territory, and networked voice communication. The Commander class played similarly to a real-time strategy game, with the player viewing the game from a bird's-eye perspective and issuing orders to players and AI-controlled soldiers.

Team Fortress 2 was first shown at E3 1999 as Team Fortress 2 Brotherhood of Arms, where Valve showcased new technologies including parametric animation, which blended animations for smoother, more lifelike movement, and Intel's multi-resolution mesh technology, which dynamically reduced the detail of distant on-screen elements to improve performance. The game earned several awards including Best Online Game and Best Action Game.

In mid-2000, Valve announced that Team Fortress 2 had been delayed for a second time. They attributed the delay to development switching to its new in-house engine, Source. Following the announcement, Valve released no news on the game for six years. Walker and Cook worked on various other Valve projects; Walker was project lead on Half-Life 2: Episode One and Cook worked on Valve's content distribution platform Steam. Team Fortress 2 became a prominent example of vaporware, a long-anticipated game that had seen years of development, and was often mentioned alongside another much-delayed game, Duke Nukem Forever. Walker said that Valve built three or four different versions of Team Fortress 2 before settling on their final design. Shortly before the release of Half-Life 2 in 2004, Valve's marketing director Doug Lombardi confirmed that Team Fortress 2 was still in development.

Final design and release 
Valve reintroduced Team Fortress 2 at the July 2006 EA Summer Showcase event. Departing from the realistic visual design of other Valve games, Team Fortress 2 features a cartoon-like visual style influenced by 20th-century commercial illustrations and the artwork of J. C. Leyendecker, Dean Cornwell, and Norman Rockwell, achieved through Gooch shading. The game debuted with the Source engine's new dynamic lighting, shadowing and soft particle technologies alongside Half-Life 2: Episode Two. It was the first game to implement the Source engine's new Facial Animation 3 features.

Valve abandoned the realistic style when it became impossible to reconcile it with the unrealistic gameplay, with opposing armies having constructed elaborate bases directly next to each other. The Commander class was abandoned as other players would simply refuse to follow their orders.

Valve designed each character, team, and equipped weapon to be visually distinct, even at range; for example, the coloring draws attention to the chest area, bringing focus on the equipped weapon. The voices for each of the classes were based on imagining what people from the 1960s would expect the classes to have sounded like, according to writer Chet Faliszek.

The map design has an "evil genius" theme with archetypical spy fortresses, concealed within inconspicuous buildings such as industrial warehouses and farms to give plausibility to their close proximities; these bases are usually separated by a neutrally themed space. The bases hide exaggerated super weapons such as laser cannons, nuclear warheads, and missile launch facilities, taking the role of objectives. The maps have little visual clutter and stylized, almost impressionistic modeling, to allow enemies to be spotted more easily. The impressionistic design approach also affects textures, which are based on photos that are filtered and improved by hand, giving them a tactile quality and giving Team Fortress 2 its distinct look. The bases are designed to let players immediately know where they are. RED bases use warm colors, natural materials, and angular shapes, while BLU bases use cool colors, industrial materials, and orthogonal shapes.

During the July 2006 Electronic Arts press conference, Valve revealed that Team Fortress 2 would ship as the multiplayer component of The Orange Box. A conference trailer showcasing all nine of the classes demonstrated for the first time the game's whimsical new visual style. Managing director of Valve Gabe Newell said that the company's goal was to create "the best looking and best-playing class-based multiplayer game". A beta release of the entire game was made on Steam on September 17, 2007, for customers who had pre-purchased The Orange Box, who had activated their Black Box coupon, which was included with the ATI HD 2900XT Graphics cards, and for members of Valve's Cyber Café Program. The beta continued until the game's final release.
 
The game was released on October 10, 2007, both as a standalone product via Steam and at retail stores as part of The Orange Box compilation pack, priced at each gaming platform's recommended retail price. The Orange Box also contains Half-Life 2, Half-Life 2: Episode One, Half-Life 2: Episode Two, and Portal. Valve offered The Orange Box at a ten percent discount for those who pre-purchased it via Steam before the October 10 release, as well as the opportunity to participate in the beta test.

Post-release 
Since the release of Team Fortress 2, Valve has continually released free updates and patches through Steam for Windows, OS X, and Linux users; though most patches are used for improving the reliability of the software or to tweak gameplay changes, several patches have been used to introduce new features and gameplay modes, and are often associated with marketing materials such as comics or videos offered on the Team Fortress 2 website; this blog is also used to keep players up to date with the ongoing developments in Team Fortress 2. As of July 2012, each class has been given a dedicated patch that provides new weapons, items, and other gameplay changes; these class patches typically included the release of the class's "Meet the Team" video. Other major patches have included new gameplay modes including the Payload, Payload Race, Training, Highlander, Medieval, and Mann vs. Machine modes. Themed patches have also been released, such as a yearly Halloween-themed event called "Scream Fortress", where players may obtain unique items available only during a set period around the holiday. Other new features have given players the ability to craft items within the game from other items, trade items with other players, purchase in-game items through funds in Steam, and save and edit replay videos that can be posted to YouTube.

Valve has released tools to allow users to create maps, weapons, and cosmetic items through a contribution site; the most popular are added as official content for the game. This approach has subsequently created the basis for the Steam Workshop functionality of the software client. In one case, more than fifty users from the content-creation community worked with Valve to release an official content update in May 2013, with all of the content generated by these players. Valve reported that as of June 2013, over $10 million has been paid back to over 400 community members that have helped to contribute content to the game, including a total of $250,000 for the participants in the May 2013 patch. To help promote community-made features, Valve has released limited-time events, such as the "Gun Mettle" or "Invasion" events in the second half of 2015, also including the "Tough Break" update in December 2015, in which players can spend a small amount of money which is paid back to the community developers for the ability to gain unique items offered while playing on community-made maps during the event.

Development of the new content had been confirmed (but later quietly cancelled) for the Xbox 360, while development for the PlayStation 3 was deemed "uncertain" by Valve. However, the PlayStation 3 version of Team Fortress 2 received an update that repaired some of the issues found within the game, ranging from graphical issues to online connectivity problems; this update was included in a patch that also repaired issues found in the other games within The Orange Box. The updates released on PC and planned for later release on Xbox 360 include new official maps and game modes, as well as tweaks to classes and new weapons that can be unlocked through the game's achievement system. The developers attempted to negotiate with Xbox 360 developer Microsoft to keep the Xbox 360 releases of these updates free, but Microsoft refused and Valve announced that they would release bundles of several updates together to justify the price. Because of the cost of patching during the seventh generation of video game consoles, Valve has been unable to provide additional patches to the Xbox 360 version since 2009, effectively cancelling development of the console versions.

On June 10, 2010, Team Fortress 2 was released for OS X, shortly after the release of Steam for OS X. The release was teased by way of an image similar to early iPod advertising, showing a dark silhouette of the Heavy on a bright green background, his Sandvich highlighted in his hand. Virtual earbuds, which can be worn when playing on either OS X or Windows once acquired, were given to players playing the game on OS X before June 14, though the giveaway period was later extended to August 16.

On November 6, 2012, Valve announced the release of Team Fortress 2 for Linux as part of a restricted beta launch of Steam on the platform. This initial release of Steam and Team Fortress 2 was targeted at Ubuntu with support for other distributions planned for the future. Later, on December 20, 2012, Valve opened up access to the beta, including Team Fortress 2, to all Steam users without the need to wait for an invitation. On February 14, 2013, Valve announced the full release of Team Fortress 2 for Linux. From then to March 1, anyone who played the game on Linux would receive a free Tux penguin, which can be equipped in-game.

Team Fortress 2 was announced in March 2013 to be the first game to officially support the Oculus Rift, a consumer-grade virtual reality headset. A patch will be made to the client to include a "VR Mode" that can be used with the headset on any public server.

In April 2020, source code for 2018 versions Team Fortress 2 and Counter-Strike: Global Offensive leaked online. This created fears that malicious users would use the code to make remote code execution software and attack servers or players' computers. Several fan projects halted development until the impact of the leak could be determined. Valve confirmed the legitimacy of the code leaks, but stated they do not believe it affects servers and clients running the latest official builds of either game.

On May 1, 2020, shortly following the death of the voice actor of the Soldier, Rick May, Valve released an update to Team Fortress 2, adding a tribute to his voicework as the Soldier in the form of a new main menu theme (a rendition of Taps), as well as statues of the Soldier saluting, added to most of the official in-game maps. These statues all featured a commemorative plaque dedicated to May and lasted through the end of the month. One of these statues, appearing on the map "cp_granary", the setting of the "Meet the Soldier" short video, was made permanent in an August 21 update.

Free-to-play 
On June 23, 2011, Valve announced that Team Fortress 2 would become free to play. Unique equipment including weapons and outfits would be available as microtransactions through the in-game store, tied through Steam. Walker stated that Valve would continue to provide new features and items free. Walker stated that Valve had learned that the more players Team Fortress 2 had, the more value it had for each player.

The move came a week after Valve introduced several third-party free-to-play games to Steam and stated they were working on a new free-to-play game. Within nine months of becoming free to play, Valve reported that revenue from Team Fortress 2 had increased by a factor of twelve.

Bot accounts and "#SaveTF2" 
Since early 2020, Team Fortress 2 has endured large amounts of bot accounts entering Valve casual matchmaking servers. Though bot accounts had been an issue in Team Fortress 2 for some time prior to this, multiple sources began to report a spike in activity for these bot accounts. The activities of these bots have included forcibly crashing servers, spamming copypastas in the text chats of matches, assuming other players' usernames, and the usage of aimbots. Additionally, some bots were programmed taking advantage of a TF2 source code leak that Valve had confirmed in April 2020. A common bot that exploited this leak used the Sniper class, allowing them to exploit the "headshot" mechanic to instantly kill enemy players from across the map regardless of direction they were aiming.

On June 16, 2020, Valve responded to this by restricting accounts that have not paid for Mann Co. Store items from the use of voice and text chat in-game. On June 24, all players were restricted from changing their Steam username while connected to any Valve matchmaking server or any server with display name updates disabled. Their updated username would display on the Steam platform, but would not show in game until they reconnected to the server or joined a new server. The change was implemented to prevent bots from changing their display name to impersonate legitimate players, which allowed the bots to avoid being kicked due to the confusion caused by their duplicate name.

Approximately one year later, on June 22, 2021, additional changes were implemented to discourage bot activity. Another YouTuber, Toofty, posted a video that provided input from several of those that were behind the bot problem; reasons given ranged from grieving against Valve developers to simply finding the disruption fun to watch. These are issues normally dealt with by a game's developer but Valve's lack of response allowed their activities to go unchecked for two years. 

These issues remained ongoing as of May 2022, prompting YouTuber SquimJim to uploaded a video to his YouTube channel encouraging his viewers to express their grievances to Valve and news outlets through letters. After receiving over a hundred news tips, IGN journalist Rebekah Valentine wrote of her experience with trying to play the game. She remarked that the game was "literally unplayable" on official Valve servers, forcing many players to join unofficial community servers instead. She also said that some bots would "...spam chat with homophobic or racist remarks, outside links, or just plain rude or obnoxious messages". In response to these issues, Robin Atkin Downes, voice actor for the Medic, also reached out to his contacts at Valve for a response, and encouraged fans to continue making their voices heard in a "peaceful, passionate manner". 

On May 26, 2022, members of the TF2 community held a "peaceful protest" on Twitter using the hashtag #savetf2 with the goal of getting a response from Valve regarding the issues. With the hashtag trending on Twitter, Valve responded, saying "TF2 community, we hear you! We love this game and know you do, too. We see how large this issue has become and are working to improve things."

Across June and July 2022, Valve released a number of patches to help players deal with the bot issue, such as improving the game's vote kicking system so that both teams can vote to kick players accused of abusive behavior at the same time. Valve took down the servers for five minutes in August 2022, during which a number of bans were issued via Valve Anti-Cheat to players that were known to be running these bots, effectively ending the problem. Valve's efforts helped to increase the player count in the months that followed.

On February 9, 2023, a blog post was shared on the official website, saying that a new "update-sized" update was coming to the game. The update will be released sometime around summer and will use community-made content submitted before May 1st. However, shortly after the post was made, Valve silently changed the message to say "holiday-sized update" instead.

Tie-in materials 

Beginning in May 2007, to promote the game, Valve began a ten-video advertisement series referred to as "Meet the Team". Constructed using Source Filmmaker and using more detailed character models, the series consists of short videos introducing each class and displaying their personalities and abilities. The videos are usually interspersed with simulated gameplay footage. The format of the videos varies greatly; the first installment, "Meet the Heavy", depicts him being interviewed, while "Meet the Soldier" shows the Soldier giving a misinformed lecture on Sun Tzu to a row of severed BLU heads as if they were raw recruits. He claims Sun Tzu "invented" fighting, then further confuses this claim with the story of Noah and his Ark. The videos were generally released through Valve's official YouTube channels, though in one notable exception, the "Meet the Spy" video was leaked onto YouTube, several days before its intended release.

Early "Meet the Team" videos were based on the audition scripts used for the voice actors for each of the classes; the "Meet the Heavy" script is nearly word-for-word a copy of the Heavy's script. Later videos, such as "Meet the Sniper", contain more original material. The videos have been used by Valve to help improve the technology for the game, specifically improving the facial animations, as well as a source of new gameplay elements, such as the Heavy's "Sandvich" or the Sniper's "Jarate". The final video in the Meet the Team series, "Meet the Pyro", was released on June 27, 2012. Gabe Newell has stated that Valve used the "Meet the Team" series as a means of exploring the possibilities of making feature film movies themselves. He believes that only game developers themselves have the ability to bring the interesting parts of a game to a film, and suggested that this would be the only manner through which a Half-Life-based movie would be made. A fifteen-minute short, "Expiration Date", was released on June 17, 2014. The shorts were made using Source Filmmaker, which was officially released and has been in open beta as of July 11, 2012.

In more recent major updates to the game, Valve has presented teaser images and online comic books that expand the fictional contuinuity and characters of Team Fortress 2, as part of the expansion of the "cross-media property", according to Newell. In August 2009, Valve brought aboard American comic writer Michael Avon Oeming to teach Valve "about what it means to have a character and do character development in a comic format, how you do storytelling". "Loose Canon", a comic associated with the Engineer Update, establishes the history of RED versus BLU as a result of the last will and testament of Zepheniah Mann in 1890, forcing his two bickering sons Blutarch and Redmond to vie for control of Zepheniah's lands between them; both have engineered ways of maintaining their mortality to the present, waiting to outlast the other while employing separate forces to try to wrest control of the land. This and other comics also establish other background characters such as Saxton Hale, the CEO of Mann Co., the company that provides the weapons for the two sides and was bequeathed to one of Hale's ancestors by Zepheniah, and the Administrator, the game's announcer, that watches over, encourages the RED/BLU conflict, and keeps each side from winning. The collected comics were published by Dark Horse Comics in Valve Presents: The Sacrifice and Other Steam-Powered Stories, a volume along with other comics created by Valve for Portal 2 and Left 4 Dead, and released in November 2011. Cumulative details in updates both in-game and on Valve's sites from 2010 through 2012 were part of a larger alternate reality game preceding the reveal of the Mann vs. Machine mode, which was revealed as a co-op mode on August 15, 2012.

Marketing and microtransactions 

Valve had provided other promotions to draw players into the game. Valve has held weekends of free play for Team Fortress 2 before the game was made free-to-play. Through various updates, hats and accessories can be worn by any of the classes, giving players an ability to customize the look of their character, and extremely rare hats named "Unusuals" have particle effects attached to it and are only obtainable through opening "crates" or trading with other players. New weapons were added in updates to allow the player to choose a loadout and play style that best suits them.

Hats and weapons can be gained as a random drop, through the crafting/trading systems, or via cross-promotion: Limited-edition hats and weapons have been awarded for pre-ordering or gaining Achievements in other content from Steam, both from Valve (such as Left 4 Dead 2 and Alien Swarm) or other third-party games such as Sam & Max: The Devil's Playhouse, Worms Reloaded, Killing Floor, or Poker Night at the Inventory (which features the Heavy class as a character). According to Robin Walker, Valve introduced these additional hats as an indirect means for players to show status within the game or their affiliation with another game series simply by visual appearance.

The Pyro, Heavy, and Spy all function as a single playable character in the PC release of Sonic & All-Stars Racing Transformed. The Pyro, Medic, Engineer, and Heavy appear as playable characters in Dungeon of the Endless. The Pyro was added as a playable character to Killing Floor in 2010, along with appearing as a henchman in the 2021 game Evil Genius 2.

The game's first television commercial premiered during the first episode of the fifth season of The Venture Bros. in June 2013, featuring in-game accessories that were created with the help of Adult Swim.

Items and economy  
In Team Fortress 2, players can trade with others for items such as weapons and cosmetics. This functionality was added in the 2010 Mann-Conomy Update, alongside being able to purchase items through an in-game store with real money. Operating largely through informal gray markets before the introduction of the official Steam Community Market, trading items made players susceptible to fraud.

Team Fortress 2 features an in-built item valuing system known as an item quality, assigned to a given instance of an item through a variety of different means and ranging  from "Normal" items used as the stock weapons of each class, to "Unique" items used as the base obtainable items from the item drop or achievement systems, to far rarer qualities such as "Strange", "Unusual" or "Decorated" which feature special cosmetic effects that can immensely increase the market value of a given item; Strange items keep track of kills or other objectives achieved while equipped in-game while Unusual items feature item-specific particle effects, with both Strange and Unusual items being obtainable through rare crafting items or randomly obtained in place of the far more common Unique items. Decorated items are instead redeemed from rare items known as "war paints", awarding the player a weapon retextured with a pseudo-random cosmetic skin. Other qualities include "Vintage", awarded to older items to compensate for changes in obtainability, and "Collector's", created through combining 200 Unique instances of a single item.

Cosmetics and war paints are typically released through seasonal "cases" that award a random item from an associated collection unique to the given season of a specific year. Such items are additionally assigned a "grade" from "Civillian" to "Mercenary" to track their relative rarity within a collection.

Third-party websites such as the crowd-sourced backpack.tf have been created to aid users in trading, as well as track the value of in-game items. Crate keys, crafting metal, and in-game items such as an "earbuds" cosmetic (also referred to as "buds") are all used as currency due to their value.

The economy of Team Fortress 2 has received significant attention from economists, journalists, and users, due to its relative sophistication and the value of many of its in-game items. It has often been the subject of study. It operates on a system of supply and demand, barter, and scarcity value, akin to many real-world economies such as that of the United States. In 2011, it was reported that the economy of Team Fortress 2 was worth over US$50 million.

2019 Crate bug 

On July 25, 2019, a bug was mistakenly included in an update - if players unboxed certain older series of Crates, they would be guaranteed to receive an Unusual-grade cosmetic item, compared to the usual 1% chance of obtaining an Unusual-grade cosmetic item from a Crate. This damaged the in-game economy, causing Unusual-grade cosmetic items able to be unboxed from these Crates to drop substantially in value. The incident has been nicknamed "The Crate Depression" (a pun on "Crate" and "The Great Depression") by fans. On July 26, 2019, this bug was fixed. Users who received any Unusual-grade cosmetic items from the bug were restricted from trading them, with Valve later announcing in an official statement on August 2, 2019 that the first Unusual-grade item any player received from the bug is tradable, with any subsequent Unusual-grade items being permanently untradeable and only usable by the player who received them.

Reception and legacy 

Team Fortress 2 received widespread critical acclaim, with overall scores of 92/100 "universal acclaim" on Metacritic. Many reviewers praised the cartoon-styled graphics, and the resulting light-hearted gameplay, and the use of distinct personalities and appearances for the classes impressed a number of critics, with PC Gamer UK stating that "until now multiplayer games just haven't had it". Similarly, the game modes were received well, GamePro described the settings as focusing "on just simple fun", while several reviewers praised Valve for the map "Hydro" and its attempts to create a game mode with variety in each map. Additional praise was bestowed on the game's level design, game balance and teamwork promotion. Team Fortress 2 has received several awards individually for its multiplayer gameplay and its graphical style, as well as having received a number of "game of the year" awards as part of The Orange Box.

Although Team Fortress 2 was well received, its removal of class-specific grenades, a feature of previous Team Fortress incarnations, was controversial amongst reviewers. IGN expressed some disappointment over this, while conversely, PC Gamer UK approved, stating "grenades have been removed entirely—thank God". Some further criticism came over a variety of issues, such as the lack of extra content such as bots (although Valve has since added bots in an update), problems of players finding their way around maps due to the lack of a minimap, and some criticism of the Medic class being too passive and repetitive in his nature. The Medic class has since been re-tooled by Valve, giving it new unlockable weapons and abilities.

With the "Gold Rush Update" in April 2008, Valve had started to add fundamentals of character customization through unlockable weapons for each class, which continued in subsequent updates, most notably the "Sniper vs. Spy Update" in April 2009, which introduced unlockable cosmetic items into the game. Further updates expanded the number of weapons and cosmetics available, but also introduced monetization options, eventually allowing it to go free-to-play. To this end, Team Fortress 2 is considered one of the first games to offer games as a service, a feature which would become more prevalent in the 2010s.

Fans of Team Fortress Classic have made a total conversion mod of Team Fortress 2 titled Team Fortress 2 Classic, which seeks to marry gameplay elements and concepts from both entries alongside scrapped ideas from the sequel's development cycle and several entirely original additions.

References

External links 

 

2007 video games
First-person shooter multiplayer online games
First-person shooters
Free-to-play video games
Hero shooters
Linux games
MacOS games
Multiplayer and single-player video games
Multiplayer online games
PlayStation 3 games
Source (game engine) games
Valve Corporation games
Vaporware video games
Video game sequels
Video games about robots
Video games adapted into comics
Video games containing loot boxes
Video games developed in the United States
Video games scored by Mike Morasky
Video games set in the 1960s
Video games set in the 1970s
Video games using Havok
Video games with commentaries
Video games with Steam Workshop support
Virtual reality games
Windows games
Xbox 360 games
Fictional nonets